KMS may refer to:

Organizations
 National Survey and Cadastre of Denmark, or Kort & Matrikelstyrelsen
 Keenie Meenie Services, private military contractor

Places and structures
 Kumasi Airport, IATA code KMS, a national airport in Ghana

Medical
 Kabuki makeup syndrome

Technology
 Kernel mode-setting, of computer display
 KMS driver, Linux kernel device driver
 KMS (hypertext), the Knowledge Management System hypertext system
 Key Management Service, a Microsoft technology
 Key management system in cryptography
 Kwangmyŏngsŏng program of North Korean satellites, prefix like KMS-4

Other
 KMS state in quantum thermodynamics
 A ship prefix sometimes attributed to vessels of the Kriegsmarine.

See also